"Army of Two" is a song by Dum Dums, released as their fourth single in 2001. It was also included on their album It Goes Without Saying.

Track listing
 CD1
(Released February 5, 2001)
 "Army of Two (radio edit)" - 3:35
 "You Want It You Got It" - 3:52
 "Until My Ship Comes In (The Grey Back mix)" - 3:38

 CD2
(Released February 5, 2001)
 "Army of Two (radio edit)" - 3:39
 "Who Knows the Way" - 2:49
 "You Knock Me Off My Feet (Live at Birmingham NEC)" - 3:52
 "Army of Two (video)"

Chart performance
"Army of Two" entered the UK Singles Chart at number 27 in the week of 5 February 2001.

References 

Dum Dums (band) songs
2001 singles
2000 songs